Juan Jesús Argüez Ruiz (born 4 April 1995), commonly known as Juanje, is a Spanish footballer who plays for CD El Ejido as a winger.

Club career
Born in La Línea de la Concepción, Cádiz, Andalusia, Juanje joined Sevilla FC's youth setup in 2007, after starting it out at Atlético Zabal Linense. He made his debut for the former's reserves on 22 February 2014, coming on as a second-half substitute in a 0–1 home loss against Real Balompédica Linense.

Juanje scored his first goal as a senior on 9 March 2014, netting the winner in a 2–1 home success over Granada CF B. On 4 May, he scored a brace in a 3–1 win at Écija Balompié.

On 6 May 2016, Juanje renewed his contract until 2018. He finished the campaign with 34 appearances and three goals, as his side achieved promotion to Segunda División.

Juanje made his professional debut on 21 September 2016, coming on as a late substitute for Bernardo in a 0–1 away loss against Levante UD. He featured rarely in the following years, suffering relegation in 2018.

On 31 August 2018, Juanje signed a one-year contract with another reserve team, Deportivo Fabril in the third division.

References

External links

1995 births
Living people
Spanish footballers
Footballers from La Línea de la Concepción
Association football midfielders
Segunda División players
Segunda División B players
Tercera División players
Sevilla Atlético players
Deportivo Fabril players
Cádiz CF B players
CD El Ejido players
Spain youth international footballers